The 2010–11 season Tunisian Ligue Professionnelle 2 is the current of second-tier football in Tunisia. The competition began on 16 August 2010 and is scheduled to end on the 27 May 2011.

Team Movements

Teams promoted to 2010–11 CLP-1
 AS Marsa
 AS Gabès

Teams relegated from 2008–09 CLP-1
 US Monastir
 AS Kasserine

Teams promoted from 2008–09 CLP-3
 CO Transports
 SC Moknine

Teams relegated to 2010–11 CLP-3
 EM Mahdia
 SA Menzel Bourguiba

Participating clubs
AS Djerba
AS Kasserine
CO Transports
CS Korba
CS M'saken
EA Mateur
ES Beni-Khalled
Jendouba Sport
LPST Tozeur
Olympique du Kef
SC Moknine
Stade Gabèsien
US Ben Guerdane
US Monastir

Table

Television rights
The Communication bureau of the FTF attributed the broadcasting rights of the Tunisian Ligue Professionnelle 2 to Hannibal TV.

External links
Soccerway.com
2010–11 Ligue 2 at rsssf.com

2010–11 in Tunisian football
Tun
Tunisian Ligue Professionnelle 2 seasons